This is a list of submissions to the 34th Academy Awards for Best Foreign Language Film. The Academy Award for Best Foreign Language Film was created in 1956 by the Academy of Motion Picture Arts and Sciences to honour non-English-speaking films produced outside the United States. The award is handed out annually, and is accepted by the winning film's director, although it is considered an award for the submitting country as a whole. Countries are invited by the Academy to submit their best films for competition according to strict rules, with only one film being accepted from each country.

For the 34th Academy Awards, thirteen films were submitted in the category Academy Award for Best Foreign Language Film. Argentina, Austria and Switzerland submitted films for the first time. France and Italy both failed to be nominated for the first time since the introduction of the competitive award. The highlighted titles were the five nominated films, which came from Denmark, Japan, Mexico, Spain and Sweden. For the second year in a row, the Oscar went to an Ingmar Bergman film from Sweden, this time for Through A Glass Darkly.

Submissions

References

Sources
 Margaret Herrick Library, Academy of Motion Picture Arts and Sciences

34